Digitus medius or middle digit can refer to:
 Middle finger (digitus medius manus)
 Third toe (digitus medius pedis)